Kelly Murray is a Canadian professional ice hockey defender, currently playing with SDE Hockey in the SDHL.

Career 
From 2012 to 2014, Murray played for Cornell University, putting up 12 points in 37 NCAA games. After missing a significant number of games due to injuries and the introduction of a new rule allowing players to join USports without sitting out for a year, she left Cornell to join the University of British Columbia. She would play for the team until 2017, serving as an assistant captain for the team and putting up 52 points in 80 USports games. She was named to the 2017 USports women's all-star team.

She was drafted 12th overall by the Calgary Inferno in the 2017 CWHL draft. She signed her first professional contract with the Inferno ahead of the 2017–18 season. She would win the Clarkson Cup with the team the following year.

After the collapse of the CWHL in May 2019, she left North America to sign with SDE Hockey in Sweden. She served as an assistant captain for the team in her first SDHL season, scoring 13 points in 34 games as SDE made the playoffs for the first time in history. She scored her first SDHL goal in a 6–0 victory against Göteborg HC on the 17th of November 2019.

International 
She represented Canada at the 2017 Winter Universiade, winning a silver medal.

Personal life 
Her sister, Eden Murray, also played professionally with the Inferno. Her uncle, Andy Murray, is a former NHL head coach, her cousins Brady Murray and Jordy Murray both played professional hockey in Switzerland, and her cousin Sarah Murray was head coach of the unified Korean team at the 2018 Winter Olympics.

References

External links

1994 births
Living people
SDE Hockey players
Calgary Inferno players
University of British Columbia alumni
Ice hockey people from Alberta
Sportspeople from Medicine Hat
Cornell Big Red women's ice hockey players
Competitors at the 2017 Winter Universiade
Universiade medalists in ice hockey
Universiade silver medalists for Canada